The 1992 Olympic commemorative coins are a series of commemorative coins which were issued by the United States Mint in 1992.

Legislation
The 1992 Olympic Commemorative Coin Act authorized the production of three coins, a clad half dollar, a silver dollar, and a gold half eagle. Congress authorized the coins to support the training of American athletes participating in the 1992 Olympic Games in Barcelona, Spain. The act allowed the coins to be struck in both proof and uncirculated finishes. The coins were released January 17, 1992.

Designs

Half Dollar

The obverse design of the 1992 Olympic commemorative half dollar, designed by William Cousins, features a gymnast in motion with the American flag and the Olympic rings in the background. The reverse, designed by Steven Bieda, features an olive branch crossing the Olympic torch.

Dollar

The obverse of the 1992 Olympic commemorative dollar, designed by John Deecken, captures a pitcher throwing a baseball to home plate along with the Olympic Rings.
The reverse of the coin, designed by Marcel Jovine, features the Olympic Rings, olive branches, and stars and stripes.

Half eagle

The obverse of the 1992 Olympic commemorative half eagle, designed by Jim Sharpe, features an Olympic sprinter in a burst of speed with the American flag in the background. The reverse of the coin, designed by T. James Ferrell, features a design that unites two majestic symbols, the Olympic Rings, and the American Bald Eagle.

Specifications
Half Dollar
 Display Box Color: Maroon
 Edge: Reeded
 Weight: 11.34 grams
 Diameter: 30.61 millimeters; 1.205 inches
 Composition: 92% silver; 8% copper (Cupronickel)

Dollar
 Display Box Color: Maroon
 Edge: Reeded
 Weight: 26.730 grams; 0.8594 troy ounce
 Diameter: 38.10 millimeters; 1.50 inches
 Composition: 90% Silver, 10% Copper

Half Eagle
 Display Box Color: Maroon
 Edge: Reeded
 Weight: 8.359 grams; 0.2687 troy ounce
 Diameter: 21.59 millimeters; 0.850 inch
 Composition: 90% Gold, 3.6% Silver, 6.4% Copper

See also

 United States commemorative coins
 List of United States commemorative coins and medals (1990s)
 1984 Summer Olympics commemorative coins
 1988 Olympic commemorative coins

References

Commemorative coins of the United States